The 2008 Crewe and Nantwich by-election was a parliamentary by-election held on 22 May 2008, for the House of Commons constituency of Crewe and Nantwich, in Cheshire, England. The election was won by the Conservative party candidate Edward Timpson, who defeated the Labour party candidate Tamsin Dunwoody, on a swing from Labour to Conservative of 17.6%, a swing that in a general election would have seen nine Labour cabinet ministers lose their seats.

At the time of the by-election, a swing of 7% in a general election would have seen the Conservatives gain an overall majority over Labour. This was the first seat gained by the Conservatives in a by-election since the 1982 Mitcham and Morden by-election and the first seat they had taken from Labour in a by-election since the 1978 Ilford North by-election thirty years earlier.

Overview
The by-election was called following the death on 17 April 2008 of the sitting MP Gwyneth Dunwoody. The timing of the election caused controversy as, by convention, by-elections are not moved until after the funeral of the deceased Member of Parliament, which drew protests from Conservative and Liberal Democrat members in the House of Commons. However the writ was moved with the approval of the Dunwoody family.

The election had attracted high media and public interest following heavy defeats for the incumbent Labour party in the local elections held earlier that same month, and the fact it followed the controversial removal by the Labour government of the 10 pence national income tax band, which had seen a backbench rebellion against Prime Minister Gordon Brown, causing an announcement in the same month of a recovery package to help the people left worse off by the move.

Immediately following the announcement of the result following the speeches, the defeated Tamsin Dunwoody speaking live to the BBC blamed the swing on a higher turn-out than usual due to the high interest in the election, despite both the turnout and winning vote being lower than the 2005 general election result for this seat. Telling the BBC the Labour vote "held up" in a "democratic decision", defeated Labour candidate Tamsin Dunwoody called herself a "fighter". New MP Edward Timpson said in his victory speech that he would "not let you down", whilst Brown attributed the defeat to rising petrol prices, and the recent increases in the cost of living.

Result

Opinion polling

An ICM poll from mid-May gave the Conservative candidate 43% to Labour's 39% and the Lib Dems' 16%; a second ICM poll from a week after gave the Conservatives 45% to Labour's 37%.

Candidates
On 3 May 2008, incumbent Gwyneth Dunwoody's daughter Tamsin, a former member of the National Assembly for Wales, was selected as the Labour candidate. Prior to Dunwoody's death, the Conservatives and Liberal Democrats had already selected candidates to contest the seat at the general election. The Conservative Party candidate Edward Timpson was a barrister practising in Chester. Since 2006, he had been the Conservative Party's campaigns co-ordinator for the Eddisbury constituency. The Liberal Democrat candidate Elizabeth Shenton had worked as a senior manager for the RBS and NatWest, where she was an active member of the trade union. At the time of the election she was also a councillor in Newcastle-under-Lyme.

The UK Independence Party candidate was Mike Nattrass, MEP for the nearby West Midlands and a former deputy party leader. Robert Smith, a 23-year-old town planner (and transport planning specialist) educated at the University of Liverpool stood for the Green Party of England and Wales and particularly campaigned to reverse the privatisation of British Rail (and associated fare increases).

The Official Monster Raving Loony Party stood "The Flying Brick" (his legal name, although he was formerly known as Nick Delves), the party's treasurer and Shadow Minister for the Abolition of Gravity (see Official Monster Raving Loony Party#Crewe and Nantwich By-Election). Independent candidate Mark Walklate is a locally educated salesperson (with a business degree) who stood for the Conservatives in the 2006 and 2007 council elections. Paul Thorogood's party, Cut Tax on Petrol and Diesel, was registered with the Electoral Commission on 23 March 2008, with Thorogood as its Leader, Nominating Officer and Treasurer, although his party is listed on the nomination paper as "Cut Tax on Diesel and Petrol" (the fourth and sixth words reversed). The newly formed Beauties for Britain Party fielded Gemma Garrett, the then-Miss Great Britain, as a candidate in what was their first election campaign, announcing that they wanted to "help make Westminster as glamorous a place as its fellow European legislatures, where beautiful women abound in the higher echelons of government". The party was not, however, registered with the Electoral Commission, so she had to stand as an independent. Garrett and fellow independent Mark Walklate are recorded as having no party name or description at all on the official record of candidates as opposed to having the word, 'Independent' by their names on the ballot paper.

Campaign
The Labour Party ran a personal class-based campaign against the Conservative candidate, calling him "the Tarporley Toff", "Lord Snooty", "Tory Boy Timpson". Labour supporters donned top hats to mock Timpson, whose family own Timpson, a national shoe repair and key-cutting business. This has been viewed by some social commentators as a form of reverse snobbery. Dunwoody, who arrived for the campaign from her  holding in Wales, was termed "One of us", as she was daughter of the deceased Labour MP. The campaign was criticised by a number of national newspapers, including the left-leaning Guardian as well as The Times, while Dunwoody herself was confronted by Jeremy Paxman on Newsnight over the fact that she has an entry in Burke's Peerage and Baronetage.

On the last day of the campaign, the accidental communication by a Conservative party worker of voting intention data of 8,000 people to a radio station sparked an investigation by the Information Commissioner into possible breaches of data protection laws.

History

The constituency had been held by Gwyneth Dunwoody for Labour since its creation in 1983. Just three parties contested the seat at the 2005 UK general election. Dunwoody held the seat with a reduced majority, while both the Conservative Party and Liberal Democrats enjoyed an increase in their vote share.

References

External links
 Nick The Flying Brick candidate's website including manifesto
 Tamsin Dunwoody official campaign page
 Mike Nattrass official website
 David Roberts English Democrats announcement of candidacy
 Elizabeth Shenton official campaign page
 Robert Smith Green Party announcement of candidacy
 Paul Thorogood Cut Tax on Petrol and Diesel by-election page
 Edward Timpson campaign website
 Election leaflets from the by-election campaign

2008 elections in the United Kingdom
By-elections to the Parliament of the United Kingdom in Cheshire constituencies
2008 in England
Crewe
2000s in Cheshire
Nantwich